This list of sans-serif typefaces details standard sans-serif fonts used in printing, classical typesetting and printing.



List of samples

Additional sans-serif typefaces

 APHont
 Bauhaus
 Berlin Sans
 Brandon Grotesque
 Computer Modern Sans
 Espy Sans
 Euphemia (typeface)
 Gautami
 Gilroy
 Greycliff
 Modern (vector font included with Windows 3.1)
 Neuzeit S
 Nobel
 Rotis Sans
 Sherbrooke
 Tilson
 Triplex
 Twentieth Century (Tw Cen MT)
 Zurich

See also
Fixedsys
List of display typefaces
List of monospaced typefaces
List of script typefaces
List of serif typefaces

 
Sans-serif
Sans-serif